The Azerbaijani diaspora are the communities of Azerbaijanis living outside the places of their ethnic origin: Azerbaijan and the Iranian region of Azerbaijan.

According to Ethnologue, there were over 1 million Azerbaijani-speakers of the north dialect in southern Dagestan, Armenia, Estonia, Georgia, Kazakhstan, Kyrgyzstan, Russia, Turkmenistan, and Uzbekistan as of 1993. Other sources, such as national censuses, confirm the presence of Azerbaijanis throughout the former Soviet Union. The Ethnologue figures are outdated in the case of Armenia, where the Nagorno-Karabakh conflict has affected the population of Azerbaijanis. Ethnologue further reports that an additional 1 million Iranian Azerbaijanis live outside Iran, but these figures most likely are a reference to the Iraqi Turkmen, a distinct though related Turkic people. The number of Azerbaijanis around the world is estimated about 30-35 million people, only 9,961,396 of which are in Azerbaijan, and another 13 million in Iran

History of the Azerbaijani diaspora

The main migration of Azerbaijani people occurred at the same time of Turkic migration between the 6th and 11th centuries (the Early Middle Ages), when they spread across most of Central Asia and into Europe and the Middle East. In the following centuries the local population began to be assimilated from the emerging Azerbaijani migrants.

Azerbaijanis in North America 
The Azerbaijani diaspora in the United States and Canada was established in the mid-to-late 20th century. The Azerbaijanis have settled in the North, Central and Southern parts of the U.S. and in all major Canadian cities. The majority of Azerbaijanis have settled in the states of California, New Jersey, New York, Michigan, Pennsylvania, Texas and District of Columbia. Most Azerbaijanis living in the U.S. are migrants from Iran.

There are several organizations connecting Azerbaijani Americans as well as Azerbaijani Canadians.

US Azerbaijanis Network – USAN 
The US Azerbaijanis network combines all Azerbaijani, Turkish and other Diaspora and community organizations of USA, groups, societies, coalitions, networks associations and clubs. Purpose of this network is to bring together Azerbaijani-American potential electorate. Activity of USAN is to inform voters about the voting process and voter registration, to provide their participation in the American political debate, to enhance their participation in the vote and to increase voter turnout. Executive Director of the American Azerbaijanis Network (USAN) is Adil Bagirov.

Azerbaijan America Alliance 
Azerbaijan America Alliance is a non-governmental organization. Its mission is to help form an atmosphere of mutual understanding and respect between the peoples of Azerbaijan and America. The 20th anniversary of the Khojaly genocide was held in February 2012, which is the one of its most significant events. Demonstration of posters and banners in the streets of New York and Washington, D.C., statements by U.S. Congressmen, presentation of films about Khojaly genocide and other events were all a part of the commemoration. One page each in The Washington Post and The New York Times were dedicated to the Khojaly genocide.

Azerbaijan Society of America 
Azerbaijan Society of America which is the first Azerbaijani-American community organization was established in 1957 in New Jersey, USA by Naghi Sheykhzamanli. His granddaughter Tomris Azari is current chairman of the American Azerbaijanis Society. As well as, Tomris is deputy chairwoman of the Coordinating Council of the World Azerbaijanis. She was awarded the "Order of Glory" by Ilham Aliyev in 2006.

United States-Azerbaijan Chamber of Commerce 
U.S.-Azerbaijan Chamber of Commerce (USACC) was established in 1995. Its mission is to help the establishment of long-term business ties between Azerbaijan and America. It was a main driving force for the Baku-Tbilisi-Ceyhan oil pipeline and the Baku-Tbilisi-Erzurum gas pipeline. USACC provides the improvement of network services between governmental and non-governmental entities, business organizations of the US and Azerbaijan.

Azerbaijani – American Council (AAC) 
The council has been operating in Washington since 1994. The organization arranges series of events, exhibitions, and seminars in research centers related to Azerbaijani culture. The members of the organization send statements and letters to the president, all state delegates, senators, congressmen, as well as to the press, about the Khojaly Massacre, March days, the Nagorno-Karabakh conflict between Armenia-Azerbaijan and other issues. The American-Azerbaijani Council was registered in 2006 as a non-governmental organization. The council is the largest Azerbaijani organization operating in California. The purpose of the council is to bring together ideas of Azerbaijanism, to present these ideas through educational and cultural programs. The Council regularly organizes forums. Azerbaijani students studying in California and people doing a research about Azerbaijan are invited to the forum, and economic, political and technological issues are discussed in this forums. American-Azerbaijan Council has a representative office in Texas. The president of the American-Azerbaijani Council is Javid Huseynov.

Network of Azerbaijani Canadians (NAC) 
The Network of Azerbaijani Canadians (NAC, French: Réseau des Canadiens Azerbaïdjanais, Azerbaijani: Kanadalı Azərbaycanlılar Şəbəkəsi) is a fully community-funded and the largest grassroots Azerbaijani advocacy organization in Canada. Founded in 2020, the organization advocates on behalf of Azerbaijani Canadians in matters of public policy. The organization is based in Toronto; board members and organization members are spread across Canada including Ottawa, Edmonton, Calgary, Montreal and Vancouver. The Network of Azerbaijani Canadians is a registered non-profit and managed by its board of directors. Nika Jabiyeva is the executive director of NAC, appointed by the organization's board of directors.

Azerbaijanis in Europe

The Federation of Turkish-Azerbaijani Associations 
The Federation of Turkish-Azerbaijani Associations was established in 2004 in Kocaeli. The Heydar Aliyev Park was opened in the Kartepe municipal area on the eve of the World Azerbaijanis Solidarity Day in 2010 as a result of the activity of Turkish-Azerbaijani Associations Federation. Another park in Derince was put into operation on 29 November 2011. A chairman of Turkey-Azerbaijan Federation of Associations is Bilal Dundar.

Azerbaijani Youth Union of Russia 
The Azerbaijani Youth Union of Russia was established on 18 April 2009 in Moscow. Its purpose is to protect the Azerbaijan national cultural values, support of Azerbaijani youth, better integration of Azerbaijani youth into the cultural life of Russian society, and the development of education. Its central office is located in Moscow, and there are several regional offices in the north and west of Russia, Volga area, North Caucasus, Far East and Siberia. The chairwoman is Leyla Aliyeva.

Organizations 
The State Committee of Azerbaijan Republic on Work with Diaspora was established to handle the communication with the diaspora and to drive the creation of new societies and organizations. In 2004 the committee effected the creation of about 40 new Azerbaijani communities worldwide.

Current number of Azerbaijanis in select countries

See also
 State Committee on Work with Diaspora of Azerbaijan Republic

References

 
European diasporas
Asian diasporas